Monnechroma seabrai is a species of beetle in the family Cerambycidae. It was described by S. A. Fragoso and Miguel A. Monné in 1989. It is known from southeastern Brazil.

References

Callichromatini
Beetles described in 1989
Endemic fauna of Brazil